Sayella is a genus of minute sea snails, marine gastropod mollusks or micromollusks in the family Pyramidellidae, the pyrams and their allies.

Shell description
Typical for this genus is the presence of only one prominent fold on the columella.

Distribution
This genus occurs in the Atlantic Ocean off Eastern North America and also in the tropical West Atlantic.

Species
Species within the genus Sayella include:
 Sayella abjecta (Hedley, 1909)
 Sayella chesapeakea Morrison, 1939
 Sayella fusca (C. B. Adams, 1839)
 Sayella hemphillii (Dall, 1884)
 Sayella mercedordae Penãs & Rolán, 1997
 Sayella watlingsi Morrison, 1939
Species brought into synonymy
 Sayella livida Rehder, 1935: synonym of Sayella hemphillii (Dall, 1884)
 Sayella micalii Peñas & Rolán, 1997: synonym of Tiberia micalii (Peñas & Rolán, 1997)
 Sayella producta (C. B. Adams, 1840): synonym of Syrnola producta (C. B. Adams, 1840)

References

 Vaught, K.C.; Tucker Abbott, R.; Boss, K.J. (1989). A classification of the living Mollusca. American Malacologists: Melbourne. . XII, 195 pp
 Rolán E., 2005. Malacological Fauna From The Cape Verde Archipelago. Part 1, Polyplacophora and Gastropoda

External links
 To ITIS
 To World Register of Marine Species

Pyramidellidae